Stenostola is a genus of longhorn beetles of the subfamily Lamiinae, containing the following species:

 Stenostola alboscutellata Kraatz, 1862
 Stenostola anomala Bates, 1884
 Stenostola argyrosticta Bates, 1884
 Stenostola atra Gressitt, 1951
 Stenostola basisuturalis Gressitt, 1935
 Stenostola callosicollis Breuning, 1943
 Stenostola dubia (Laicharting, 1784)
 Stenostola ferrea (Schrank, 1776)
 Stenostola impustulata (Motschulsky, 1860)
 Stenostola lineata Gressitt, 1951
 Stenostola minamii (Makihara, 1984)
 Stenostola nigerrima (Breuning, 1947)
 Stenostola niponensis Pic, 1901
 Stenostola pallida Gressitt, 1951
 Stenostola trivittata Breuning, 1947
 Stenostola unicolor Kono, 1933

References

Saperdini